Karen Walker may refer to:

 Karen Walker (designer)
 Karen Walker (footballer)
 Karen Thompson Walker
 Karen Walker, executive consultant known for her central role in Compaq's history.
 Karen Walker (Will & Grace)
Karen Handel (née Walker; born 1962), American politician